Kuvaas is a surname. Notable people with the surname include:

Karen Margrethe Kuvaas (born 1947), Norwegian politician
Torstein Olav Kuvaas (1908–1996), Norwegian politician